Icelandic people of American descent make up around 1% of Iceland's population. The first Americans known to have settled in a large group came during World War II, in the form of servicemen.

Notable individuals with American roots
 Alex Somers Artist
 Árni Johnsen Politician, His father was an American soldier.
 Björgólfur Hideaki Takefusa 1/4 American
 Þór Saari Politician, His father was Finnish-American 
 Gunnar Nelson (Fighter), 1/4 American
 Sarah Blake Bateman 
 Bobby Fischer chess player
 Danero Thomas Basketball Player

Sources 
 http://hagstofa.is
 http://www.mbl.is/mm/gagnasafn/grein.html?grein_id=1100890
 http://www.mbl.is/mm/gagnasafn/grein.html?grein_id=100063